Baiss is an English surname. Notable people with the surname include:

 James Baiss (1909–1984), English cricket player
 Reginald Baiss (1873–1955), English cricket player

See also
 Bass (surname)

English-language surnames